"Bow Down" is a song by American rock band I Prevail, released in February 2019 as the first single from their second studio album Trauma. The song received a Grammy Nomination for the Grammy Award for Best Metal Performance for the 62nd Annual Grammy Awards.

Background
The song was first released on February 26, 2019, a month before the release of its respective album, Trauma. A music video was released at the same time. It was the first single to be released from the album, being released twelve hours before "Breaking Down", and the first to be released since vocalist Brian Burkheiser had recovered from his surgery for a polyp on his vocal cords in 2017. Burkheiser struggled with the recovery, and anxiety and depressions on how to continue with the band after its rise to popularity, but overcame it to record the album, including the track, across 2018.

In November 2019, the song was nominated for the Grammy Award for Best Metal Performance.

Themes and composition
Lyrically, the song is about the band venting their criticisms of the music industry.

Reception
The song was generally well received. Metal Injection praised the song for its "crunchy [guitar] riffs, memorable breakdowns and a catchy hook". MetalSucks singled out the verses as being especially good, enjoying the screamed vocals and guitar parts as "heavy and fun".

Personnel
 Brian Burkheiser – clean vocals
 Eric Vanlerberghe – screamed vocals
 Steve Menoian – lead guitar, bass 
 Dylan Bowman – rhythm guitar 
 Gabe Helguera – drums

Charts

References

2019 songs
2019 singles
I Prevail songs
Songs written by David Pramik
Fearless Records singles